Kim Da-sol  (born 4 January 1989) is a South Korean footballer who plays as goalkeeper for Jeonnam Dragons in the K League 2.

References

External links 

1989 births
Living people
Association football goalkeepers
South Korean footballers
K League 1 players
K League 2 players
Pohang Steelers players
Daejeon Hana Citizen FC players
Incheon United FC players
Suwon Samsung Bluewings players